Jack Willis (born 24 December 1996) is an English professional rugby union player, who plays as a flanker for French Top 14 club Toulouse and the England national team.

Career
Willis played junior rugby for Reading Abbey R.F.C. before joining the Wasps Senior Academy in 2015. In November 2016 he made his first senior start for Wasps in an Anglo-Welsh Cup game against Sale Sharks. Later that month he made his Premiership debut against the same opponent.

After an exceptional 2019/2020 season in the Gallagher Premiership Willis became the recipient of multiple awards, including:
The "players' player of the year" award, the Premiership "Player of the Season" award, and the "Discovery of the Season" award.

Wasps entered administration on 17 October 2022 and Willis was made redundant along with all other players and coaching staff.

On 24 November, he joined French most-successful side Toulouse in the Top 14 competition with immediate effect.

International career
Willis was a member of the England under-20 team that hosted the 2016 World Rugby Under 20 Championship and came off the bench as England defeated Ireland in the final. In 2018 he was named in the England senior squad for their tour to South Africa. A knee injury sustained in the Premiership semi-final defeat against Saracens ruled him out of the tour.

A week after finishing as a runner up in the 2019/20 premiership final, Willis was included in Eddie Jones' England side for the final Six Nations match against Italy

Willis made his debut on 14 November 2020 against Georgia at Twickenham in the Autumn Nations Cup, and opened the scoring with a debut try in the 15th minute as England won 40-0.

International tries

References

External links

Stade Toulousain

1996 births
Living people
England international rugby union players
English rugby union players
Rugby union flankers
Rugby union players from Reading, Berkshire
Wasps RFC players
Stade Toulousain players